Nwanneka Mariauchenna "Nikki" Okwelogu (born 5 May 1995) is a Nigerian track and field athlete who competes in the shot put and discus throw events. She was the 2016 discus gold medalist at the African Championships in Athletics. Born in the United States, she set Ivy League records in the throws while at Harvard University.

Career
Born in Fresno, California to Nigerian parents, Nikki attended Clovis West High School where she competed in both shot put and discus. She went on to attend Harvard University from 2013 and competed for their Harvard Crimson track team. Her sister Nonny also became an Ivy League thrower, attending Princeton.

The 2014 season saw her first national success with a shot put win at the Nigerian Athletics Championships. She made her international debut that year. At the 2014 World Junior Championships in Athletics she competed in both the shot and discus and was a shot put finalist. Her first medal followed shortly after at the 2014 African Championships in Athletics, where she was narrowly fourth in the shot put but comfortably took the discus silver medal behind Chinwe Okoro. At nineteen years old, she was the youngest entrant in those competitions. She also competed at the 2014 Commonwealth Games that summer, ending in ninth.

Her shot put best was an Ivy League record. She placed sixth at the 2015 NCAA Division I Indoor Track and Field Championships. The following year she reached her first collegiate podium with third place in the shot put at the 2016 NCAA Indoor Championships. She also was an NCAA Outdoor finalist, taking eighth.

She also claimed the shot put silver medal behind Cameroon's Auriol Dongmo.

International competitions

National titles
Nigerian Athletics Championships
Shot put: 2014

References

External links

Living people
1995 births
Sportspeople from Lagos
Sportspeople from Fresno, California
Track and field athletes from California
Nigerian female discus throwers
Nigerian female shot putters
Commonwealth Games competitors for Nigeria
Athletes (track and field) at the 2014 Commonwealth Games
Harvard Crimson women's track and field athletes
Athletes (track and field) at the 2016 Summer Olympics
Olympic athletes of Nigeria
21st-century Nigerian women